James Floyd Soileau (born November 2, 1938) is an American record producer.

Biography
Soileau was born in Faubourg, a small community between Ville Platte and Washington, Louisiana. He grew up speaking Cajun French and did not speak English until attending school at the age of 6 years.  In his junior year of high school, he did an afternoon Cajun music show as a part-time job with KVPI radio in Ville Platte. After graduating from Ville Platte High School in 1956, he opened a small record store, Floyd's Record Shop and discovered that although people were still interested in them, Cajun French records were no longer being produced. With the financial help of a friend, Ed Manuel (a juke box operator from Mamou, Louisiana), who wanted new French records for his juke boxes, Floyd released his first record on the Big Mamou label by artists Austin Pitre and Milton Molitor. In 1957 Lawrence Walker and Aldus Roger helped Floyd launch his own label, Swallow Records.

Over the past 40 years, Swallow Records has released 265 45rpm single records and 151 albums of Cajun French music, including recordings by Adam Hebert, Belton Richard, Dewey Balfa and the Balfa Brothers, Nathan Abshire, Jambalaya Cajun Band, Paul Daigle & Cajun Gold, D.L. Menard, and many more, plus recordings by the Cajun French story teller, Marion Marcotte.  1958 saw the beginning of Jin Records with artists such as Clint West, Tommy McLain & the Boogie Kings, Lil' Bob & The Lollipops, Warren Storm, Skip Stewart, Rockin' Sidney, Rod Bernard, Johnny Allan and others making significant contributions to what was the, then, controversial swamp pop music. In 1975 he established his Maison de Soul record label, devoted to Creole and Zydeco music, including artists such as Clifton Chenier, Rockin' Dopsie, Keith Frank, Chris Ardoin, Zydeco Force, Jeffery Brousard, and others. He has always encouraged his artists to compose new songs to record, and his Flat Town Music Company now publishes over 2800 songs, a majority of which are Cajun, swamp pop, and zydeco songs.

His Swallow Publications has published two books on the Cajun French language, Cajun Dictionary and Cajun Self-taught, both by Rev. Jules Daigle, and Jeff Hannusch's I Hear You Knockin', the story of early New Orleans rhythm and blues.  He operated Swallow Recording Studios in Ville Platte for over 15 years, and sold his last studio in 1975 to Ronnie Kole, who moved the studio to Slidell, Louisiana. That year he opened a vinyl record pressing plant and printing company for LP record jackets and labels, the only such facility in Louisiana. The plant closed in 1994.  Eventually, the store would close but the online mail order business still continues.

In 1959, he married his high school sweetheart Jinver Ortego. They have three daughters, Catherine, Connie and Cindy, and one son, Christopher.  Floyd was inducted into the Acadian Museum in Louisiana on October 19, 2002.

References

External links
 
 
 

1938 births
Living people
Record producers from Louisiana
Cajun people
Swamp pop music
People from Ville Platte, Louisiana